Zubrzycki (feminine: Zubrzycka, plural Zubrzyccy) is a Polish language family name. It may be transliterated from Ukrainian as Zubryckyj, from Russian as Zubritskiy or Zubritsky, as well as other forms. A Germanized variant is Subritzky. Other variants include Zubretski/Zubretsky, Zubreski/Zubresky, Zubretskyi, Zibricki/Zubrycky, etc.

The surname may refer to:
Jan Sas Zubrzycki (1860-1935), Polish architect
Jerzy Zubrzycki (1920-2009), Polish-born Australian sociologist
Geneviève Zubrzycki (born c.1970), American sociologist
Tom Zubrycki (born 1946), Australian documentary filmmaker
Subritzky family, New Zealand
Bill Subritzky (1925-2015), New Zealand evangelist and healer

Polish-language surnames